,  (English: 'The Infant') or  (English: 'The Bethlehemers') is a Christmas tradition within the Catholic communities of Slovakia where a troupe of young men visit the homes of their neighbors and perform recitations and songs to commemorate the story of the birth of Jesus Christ. The performers are dressed in costumes said to represent shepherds or angels and carry staffs and a creche. They often accompany Christmas carolers.

See also
Koledari
Wassailing
Polaznik
List of Christmas carols

References

Slavic Christmas traditions
Christmas music
Winter traditions
Slovak traditions
Cultural depictions of the Nativity of Jesus